Cablelink (formerly known as Conception Pay TV Network) is a subscription-based cable antenna television system operator and broadband Internet service provider in the Philippines which commenced its CATV operation in 1995. It is owned and operated by Cable Link and Holdings Corporation. Currently, it operates in the southern part of Metropolitan Manila, specifically in the areas of Las Piñas, Parañaque City, Muntinlupa, Pasig, Pasay, Mandaluyong, Manila, San Juan, Pateros, Taguig, Cavite (Imus, Bacoor), Tarlac (Concepcion), and some parts in Quezon City (Damayan, Saint Peter and Santa Teresita). In September 2004, Cablelink introduced its own high-speed cable Internet known as i-Blaze Cable Internet.

References

External links
Cablelink's official website

1995 establishments in the Philippines
Television in Metro Manila
Cable television companies of the Philippines
Internet service providers of the Philippines
Telecommunications companies established in 1995
Companies based in Parañaque